Moonwalkers is a 2015 British crime comedy film directed by debut director Antoine Bardou-Jacquet, written by Dean Craig, and starring Ron Perlman, Rupert Grint and Robert Sheehan. The film, which is based on Moon landing conspiracy theories, had its world premiere at SXSW on March 14, 2015. It had a limited release on January 15, 2016 and was available through video on demand by Alchemy.

Plot
In the days leading up to the Apollo 11 Moon landing, CIA agent Tom Kidman is tasked with hiring Stanley Kubrick to film a fake moonwalk, in the event the astronauts fail in their mission. The CIA views the Moon landing as a potential ideological victory over the Soviet Union, necessary for American morale. The CIA gives Kidman a large sum of cash as an incentive for Kubrick, and orders him to murder Kubrick when the film is complete to prevent the story from leaking. Unbeknownst to the CIA, Kidman is suffering from post traumatic stress disorder due to his time in Vietnam, and responds to any frustration with extreme violence.

Kidman travels to England to speak with Kubrick's agent, only to accidentally hold a meeting with the agent's cousin, Jonny Thorpe, a struggling band promoter in debt to an East End gangster named the Iron Monger. Jonny agrees to arrange a sit-down between Kidman and Kubrick, then convinces his stoner roommate Leon to pose as the director. Leon and Kidman meet, and Jonny accepts the briefcase of money, promising the movie will be made. Thinking Kidman is simply a Hollywood producer, the pair go on a spending spree before the Iron Monger's henchman break into Jonny's house, beat him, and steal the briefcase.

Kidman sees Stanley Kubrick on television and realizes he's been duped. He confronts Jonny, who confesses his scheme. Seeing an opportunity to establish himself as a success, Jonny promises that a friend of his, a director named Renatus, can film a fake Moon landing. Jonny takes Kidman to meet Renatus at the director's mansion, which he has turned into a commune. Thinking he's being hired for an art project, Renatus accepts. Meanwhile, a hippie girl named Ella takes an interest in Kidman.

Kidman takes Jonny to confront the Iron Monger and get the briefcase of money back. Rather than negotiate with the Iron Monger, Kidman murders several of his henchmen and takes the briefcase back. Production is stalled when Renatus insists on approaching the film as a piece of performance art, intending to include several artistic flourishes. To show off his alleged immunity to marijuana, Kidman takes a hit from a bong, which turns out to have been laced with opium. To help him recover from its effects, Ella gives him LSD, sending Kidman on a bad trip, after which he has sex with Ella. In the throes of his trip, Kidman tells Ella and Leon he no longer feels compelled to solve his problems with violence. Afterwards, he makes an incoherent call to the CIA, attempting to update them on his status.

Alarmed by Kidman's call, the CIA sends several agents to England. They take the commune hostage and force everyone to begin filming the fake Moon landing. Jonny and Leon take on the roles of the astronauts; Leon, nervous at the prospect of being on television, gets high and begins having a trip on set, stumbling around the fake Moon surface. The Iron Monger arrives and engages in a shoot-out with the CIA, in which most of the Iron Monger's henchmen and CIA agents are killed. In the midst of the shoot-out, the fake footage is successfully broadcast via closed circuit to CIA headquarters. Jonny, feeling he finally has the opportunity to make a difference in the world, attempts to protect Kidman from the Iron Monger but is shot. After killing the Iron Monger, Kidman tells a stunned Jonny that his spacesuit absorbed the bullet and lies that Jonny's interference saved his life.

Now wanted by the CIA, Jonny, Leon, Kidman and Ella flee England. A montage shows news clips of American life through the 1960s, culminating with Apollo 11 reaching the Moon. In Spain, Jonny, Leon, Ella and Kidman enter a bar in time to watch the Moon landing with several villagers. They are unable to tell if the landing is real or if they're watching their fake footage.

Cast

Ron Perlman as Kidman
Rupert Grint as Jonny Thorpe
Robert Sheehan as Leon
Eric Lampaert as Glen
Tom Audenaert as Renatus
Kerry Shale as Mr. White
John Flanders as CIA Agent Murphy
Andrew Blumenthal as Kozinsky
Jay Benedict as Colonel Dickford
 Kevin Bishop as Paul
 James Cosmo as Dawson
 Stephen Campbell Moore as Derek Kaye
 Erika Sainte as Ella

Production
In June 2014, it was announced that Ron Perlman, Rupert Grint, Robert Sheehan, Stephen Campbell Moore, Kevin Bishop and James Cosmo had joined the cast of the film. It was also announced Antoine Bardou-Jacquet would be directing the film, from a screenplay by Dean Craig. It was also announced Kinology had signed on to finance the film and handle international sales. Principal photography began on May 14, 2014.

Release
The film premiered at South by Southwest on March 14, 2015. On March 16, 2015, Alchemy picked up distribution rights to the film. The film was released in the United States on January 15, 2016, in a limited release and through video on demand.

Critical reception
Moonwalkers received mixed reviews from film critics. It holds a 42% "Rotten" rating on review aggregator website Rotten Tomatoes, based on 38 reviews, with an average score of 5.06/10. On Metacritic, the film holds a rating of 39 out of 100, based on 10 critics, indicating "generally unfavorable reviews.

John DeFore of The Hollywood Reporter'' gave the film a mixed review writing: "Too much faith has been put in the comic value of Dean Craig's screenplay, which offers plenty of mishaps and shocking violent outbursts, but not so many laughs. Aside from a look at Renatus's pretentiously goofy most recent film, the funniest thing here is the most predictable scene, a sequence in which crew-cut, all-business Kidman gets dosed with acid. For a moment, Johnny turns into the grown-up of the bunch — a terrifying prospect for a plan that was counting on having a perfectionist cinematic genius at the helm." Susan Wloszczyna of RogerEbert.com gave the film a negative review, writing: "Forget a fake moon landing. "Moonwalkers" is a fake comedy, one that mistakes an endless bloody splatter-fest of a finale for the height of hilarity and never quite gets off the ground after takeoff."

References

External links
 
  (rating 2/5)

2015 films
2015 comedy films
Films about conspiracy theories
Films about filmmaking
Films about the Apollo program
Films set in 1969
French comedy films
Moon landing conspiracy theories
2015 directorial debut films
2010s English-language films
2010s French films
English-language French films